Connie Francis en El Patio is a 12" studio album recorded by American pop singer Connie Francis. The track listing consist of a compilation of Francis' most successful Spanish language pop recordings released between 1960 and 1964.

The album was released in Mexico in 1965 and is one of Francis' rarest albums to find because only a very limited quantity of copies were released.

Track listing

Side A

Side B

NOTE: As far as cover versions of Francis' US hits are listed, only the songwriters of the original English-language versions are given; the Spanish lyricists are unknown.

External links
Official Connie Francis Fan Club Site

Connie Francis albums
1964 compilation albums
Spanish-language compilation albums
MGM Records compilation albums
Albums produced by Danny Davis (country musician)